Brynów is a district in Katowice, Poland. It is located in the central part of Katowice, south-west of the immediate center, and is divided into two subdistricts:
 Brynów - Osiedle Zgrzebnioka is the eastern subdistrict with 7,200 inhabitants (in 2002)
 Brynów - Załęska Hałda is the western subdistrict with 16,800 inhabitants (in 2002)

Brynów borders the following districts of Katowice: Załęże, Osiedle Paderewskiego - Muchowiec, Śródmieście, Ligota - Panewniki, Piotrowice - Ochojec.

Among the landmarks of Brynów are:
Kopalnia Wujek, a coal mine known as the place the government of People's Republic of Poland brutally suppressed workers demonstration in December, 1981. 
Kościuszko Park, the largest park in the city
Church of St. Michael Archangel, located in Kościuszko park, is the oldest building in Katowice (from 1510)
Parachute tower, the only one in Poland, place of a battle during the Invasion of Poland

History of Brynów, as a village, goes back to the 15th century.

Brynów has its own train station. There are several major roads and a tram line.

There are several schools, five churches and three supermarkets in Brynów. A small civilian airport is nearby.

Further reading
Lech Szaraniec: Osady i osiedla Katowic. Katowice: Oficyna „Artur”, 1996. 

Districts of Katowice